is the 7th major single by the Japanese girl idol group Shiritsu Ebisu Chugaku. It was released in Japan on November 5, 2014 on the label Defstar Records.

Release details 
The single was released in three versions: two limited pressings named "Limited Ē Edition" and "Limited Bī Edition" and a regular edition named "Chū Edition". The Limited Ē Edition includes a DVD with the music video for the title track, but it has only two songs on the CD, while the other editions are CD-only but have three.

Track listing

Limited Ē Edition

Limited Bī Edition

Chū Edition (Regular Edition)

Charts

References

External links 
 Discography - Shiritsu Ebisu Shugaku official site

Shiritsu Ebisu Chugaku songs
2014 singles
Japanese-language songs
Defstar Records singles
2014 songs